Alexander Kazakis (Born July 16, 1991) is a Greek professional pool player. Kazakis is a former European 10-ball champion, and regular 9-ball player. In 2018, he was the number one ranked player by the World Pool-Billiard Association.

Career
In 2016, Kazakis won the Kremlin Cup, without losing a game. Kazakis reached the semi-final of the 2018 WPA World Nine-ball Championship; before losing to eventual winner Joshua Filler on a final frame decider.

Kazakis won the 2018 Austria Open event on the Euro Tour, defeating Denis Grabe in the final 9–6.

Kazakis finished in second place of the 2019 World Pool Masters Tournament, losing to David Alcaide in the final 9–8 having led 5-0 and 8-5.

Kazakis won the 2021 World Pool Masters, beating Shane Van Boening in the final 9–0. This is the first occasion a player has made a "clean sweep" of the final.

Titles
 2022 Pro Billiard Series Wisconsin Open 
 2021 World Pool Masters
 2018 Euro Tour Pongau Open
 2016 Kremlin Cup
 2015 European Pool Championship 10-Ball

References

External links

1991 births
Greek pool players
Place of birth missing (living people)
Living people